C-C chemokine receptor type 5, also known as CCR5 or CD195, is a protein on the surface of white blood cells that is involved in the immune system as it acts as a receptor for chemokines.

In humans, the CCR5 gene that encodes the CCR5 protein is located on the short (p) arm at position 21 on chromosome 3. Certain populations have inherited the Delta 32 mutation, resulting in the genetic deletion of a portion of the CCR5 gene. Homozygous carriers of this mutation are resistant to M-tropic strains of HIV-1 infection.

Function 
The CCR5 protein belongs to the beta chemokine receptors family of integral membrane proteins. It is a G protein–coupled receptor which functions as a chemokine receptor in the CC chemokine group.

CCR5's cognate ligands include CCL3, CCL4 (also known as MIP 1α and 1β, respectively), and CCL3L1. CCR5 furthermore interacts with CCL5 (a chemotactic cytokine protein also known as RANTES).

CCR5 is predominantly expressed on T cells, macrophages, dendritic cells, eosinophils, microglia and a subpopulation of either breast or prostate cancer cells. The expression of CCR5 is selectively induced during the cancer transformation process and is not expressed in normal breast or prostate epithelial cells. Approximately 50% of human breast cancer expressed CCR5, primarily in triple negative breast cancer.  CCR5 inhibitors blocked the migration and metastasis of breast and prostate cancer cells that expressed CCR5, suggesting that CCR5 may function as a new therapeutic target. Recent studies suggest that CCR5 is expressed in a subset of cancer cells with characteristics of cancer stem cells, which are known to drive therapy resistance, and that CCR5 inhibitors enhanced the number of cells killed by current chemotherapy. It is likely that CCR5 plays a role in inflammatory responses to infection, though its exact role in normal immune function is unclear. Regions of this protein are also crucial for chemokine ligand binding, the functional response of the receptor, and HIV co-receptor activity.

Modulation of CCR5 activity contributes to a non-pathogenic course of infection with Simian immunodeficiency virus (SIV) in several African non-human primate species that are long-term natural hosts of SIV and avoid immunodeficiency upon the infection. These regulatory mechanisms include: genetic deletions that abrogate cell surface expression of CCR5, downregulation of CCR5 on the surface of CD4+ T cells, in particular on memory cells, and delayed onset of CCR5 expression on the CD4+ T cells during development.

HIV 

HIV-1 most commonly uses the chemokine receptors CCR5 and/or CXCR4 as co-receptors to enter target immunological cells. These  receptors are located on the surface of host immune cells whereby they provide a method of entry for the HIV-1 virus to infect the cell. The HIV-1 envelope glycoprotein structure is essential in enabling the viral entry of HIV-1 into a target host cell. The envelope glycoprotein structure consists of two protein subunits cleaved from a Gp160 protein precursor encoded for by the HIV-1 env gene: the Gp120 external subunit and the Gp41 transmembrane subunit. This envelope glycoprotein structure is arranged into a spike-like structure located on the surface of the virion and consists of a trimer of Gp120-Gp41 hetero-dimers. The Gp120 envelope protein is a chemokine mimic. Though it lacks the unique structure of a chemokine, it is still capable of binding to the CCR5 and CXCR4 chemokine receptors. During HIV-1 infection, the Gp120 envelope glycoprotein subunit binds to a CD4 glycoprotein and a HIV-1 co-receptor expressed on a target cell, forming a heterotrimeric complex. The formation of this complex stimulates the release of a fusogenic peptide, causing the viral membrane to fuse with the membrane of the target host cell. Because binding to CD4 alone can sometimes result in gp120 shedding, gp120 must next bind to co-receptor CCR5 in order for fusion to proceed. The tyrosine-sulfated amino terminus of this co-receptor is the "essential determinant" of binding to the gp120 glycoprotein.  The co-receptor also recognizes the V1-V2 region of gp120 and the bridging sheet (an antiparallel, 4-stranded β sheet that connects the inner and outer domains of gp120). The V1-V2 stem can influence "co-receptor usage through its peptide composition as well as by the degree of N-linked glycosylation." Unlike V1-V2 however, the V3 loop is highly variable and thus is the most important determinant of co-receptor specificity. The normal ligands for this receptor, RANTES, MIP-1β, and MIP-1α, are able to suppress HIV-1 infection in vitro. In individuals infected with HIV, CCR5-using viruses are the predominant species isolated during the early stages of viral infection, suggesting that these viruses may have a selective advantage during transmission or the acute phase of disease. Moreover, at least half of all infected individuals harbor only CCR5-using viruses throughout the course of infection.

CCR5 is the primary co-receptor used by gp120 sequentially with CD4.  This bind results in gp41, the other protein product of gp160, released from its metastable conformation and inserted into the membrane of the host cell.  Although it has not been confirmed, binding of gp120-CCR5 involves two crucial steps: 1) The tyrosine-sulfated amino terminus of this co-receptor is an "essential determinant" of binding to gp120 (as stated previously) 2) Following step 1., there must be reciprocal action (synergy, intercommunication) between gp120 and the CCR5 transmembrane domains.

CCR5 is essential for the spread of the R5-strain of the HIV-1 virus. Knowledge of the mechanism by which this strain of HIV-1 mediates infection has prompted research into the development of therapeutic interventions to block CCR5 function. A number of new experimental HIV drugs, called CCR5 receptor antagonists, have been designed to interfere with binding between the Gp120 envelope protein and the HIV co-receptor CCR5. These experimental drugs include PRO140 (CytoDyn), Vicriviroc (Phase III trials were cancelled in July 2010) (Schering Plough), Aplaviroc (GW-873140) (GlaxoSmithKline) and Maraviroc (UK-427857) (Pfizer). Maraviroc was approved for use by the FDA in August 2007. It is the only one thus far approved by the FDA for clinical use, thus becoming the first CCR5 inhibitor. A problem of this approach is that, while CCR5 is the major co-receptor by which HIV infects cells, it is not the only such co-receptor.  It is possible that under selective pressure HIV will evolve to use another co-receptor.  However, examination of viral resistance to AD101, molecular antagonist of CCR5, indicated that resistant viruses did not switch to another co-receptor (CXCR4), but persisted in using CCR5: they either bound to alternative domains of CCR5 or to the receptor at a higher affinity.  However, because there is still another co-receptor available, it is probable that lacking the CCR5 gene does not make one immune to the virus; it would simply be more challenging for the individual to contract it.  Also, the virus still has access to CD4.  Unlike CCR5, which is not required (as evidenced by those living healthy lives even when lacking the gene as a result of the delta32 mutation), CD4 is critical in the body's immune defense system. Even without the availability of either co-receptor (even CCR5), the virus can still invade cells if gp41 were to go through an alteration (including its cytoplasmic tail) that resulted in the independence of CD4 without the need of CCR5 and/or CXCR4 as a doorway.

Cancer 

Expression of CCR5 is induced in breast and prostate epithelial cells upon transformation.  The induction of CCR5 expression promotes cellular invasion, migration, and metastasis.  The induction of metastasis involves homing to the metastatic site.  CCR5 inhibitors including maraviroc and leronlimab have been shown to block lung metastasis of human breast cancer cell lines.  In preclinical studies of immune competent mice CCR5 inhibitors blocked metastasis to the bones and brain.  CCR5 inhibitors also reduce the infiltration of tumor associated macrophages. A Phase 1 clinical study of a CCR5 inhibitor in heavily pretreated patients with metastatic colon cancer demonstrated an objective clinical response and reduction in metastatic tumor burden.

Brain 

Increased levels of CCR5 are part of the inflammatory response to stroke and death. Blocking CCR5 with Maraviroc (a drug approved for HIV) may enhance recovery after stroke.

In the developing brain, chemokine receptors such as CCR5 influence neuronal migration and connection.  After stroke, they seem to decrease the number of connection sites on neurons near the damage.

CCR5-Δ32 

CCR5-Δ32 (or CCR5-D32 or CCR5 delta 32) is an allele of CCR5.

CCR5 Δ32 is a 32-base-pair deletion that introduces a premature stop codon into the CCR5 receptor locus, resulting in a nonfunctional receptor. CCR5 is required for M-tropic HIV-1 virus entry. Individuals homozygous (denoted Δ32/Δ32) for CCR5 Δ32 do not express functional CCR5 receptors on their cell surfaces and are resistant to HIV-1 infection, despite multiple high-risk exposures. Individuals heterozygous (+/Δ32) for the mutant allele have a greater than 50% reduction in functional CCR5 receptors on their cell surfaces due to dimerization between mutant and wild-type receptors that interferes with transport of CCR5 to the cell surface. Heterozygote carriers are resistant to HIV-1 infection relative to wild types and when infected, heterozygotes exhibit reduced viral loads and a 2-3-year-slower progression to AIDS relative to wild types. Heterozygosity for this mutant allele also has shown to improve one's virological response to anti-retroviral treatment. CCR5 Δ32 has an (heterozygote) allele frequency of 9% in Europe, and a homozygote frequency of 1%.

Recent research indicates that CCR5 Δ32 enhances cognition and memory. In 2016, researchers showed that removing the CCR5 gene from mice significantly improved their memory.  CCR5 is a powerful suppressor for neuronal plasticity, learning, and memory; CCR5 over-activation by viral proteins may contribute to HIV-associated cognitive deficits.

Evolutionary history and age of the allele 

The CCR5 Δ32 allele is notable for its recent origin, unexpectedly high frequency, and distinct geographic distribution, which together suggest that (a) it arose from a single mutation, and (b) it was historically subject to positive selection.

Two studies have used linkage analysis to estimate the age of the CCR5 Δ32 deletion, assuming that the amount of recombination and mutation observed on genomic regions surrounding the CCR5 Δ32 deletion would be proportional to the age of the deletion. Using a sample of 4000 individuals from 38 ethnic populations, Stephens et al. estimated that the CCR5-Δ32 deletion occurred 700 years ago (275-1875, 95% confidence interval). Another group, Libert et al. (1998), used microsatellite mutations to estimate the age of the CCR5 Δ32 mutation to be 2100 years (700-4800, 95% confidence interval).  On the basis of observed recombination events, they estimated the age of the mutation to be 2250 years (900-4700, 95% confidence interval). A third hypothesis relies on the north-to-south gradient of allele frequency in Europe, which shows that the highest allele frequency occurred in the Nordic countries and lowest allele frequency in southern Europe.  Because the Vikings historically occupied these countries, it may be possible that the allele spread throughout Europe due to the Viking dispersal in the 8th to 10th centuries. Vikings were later replaced by the Varangians in Russia, which may have contributed to the observed east-to-west cline of allele frequency.

HIV-1 was initially transmitted from chimpanzees (Pan troglodytes) to humans in the early 1900s in Southeast Cameroon, Africa, through exposure to infected blood and body fluids while butchering bushmeat. However, HIV-1 was effectively absent from Europe until the 1980s. Therefore, given the average age of roughly 1000 years for the CCR5-Δ32 allele, it can be established that HIV-1 did not exert selection pressure on the human population for long enough to achieve the current frequencies. Hence, other pathogens have been suggested as agents of positive selection for CCR5 Δ32, including bubonic plague (Yersinia pestis) and smallpox (Variola major).
Other data suggest that the allele frequency experienced negative selection pressure as a result of pathogens that became more widespread during Roman expansion. The idea that negative selection played a role in the allele's low frequency is also supported by experiments using knockout mice and Influenza A, which demonstrated that the presence of the CCR5 receptor is important for efficient response to a pathogen.

Evidence for a single mutation 

Several lines of evidence suggest that the CCR5 Δ32 allele evolved only once. First, CCR5 Δ32 has a relatively high frequency in several different European populations but is comparatively absent in Asian, Middle Eastern and American Indian populations, suggesting that a single mutation occurred after divergence of Europeans from their African ancestor. Second, genetic linkage analysis indicates that the mutation occurs on a homogeneous genetic background, implying that inheritance of the mutation occurred from a common ancestor. This was demonstrated by showing that the CCR5 Δ32 allele is in strong linkage disequilibrium with highly polymorphic microsatellites. More than 95% of CCR5 Δ32 chromosomes also carried the IRI3.1-0 allele, while 88% carried the IRI3.2 allele.  By contrast, the microsatellite markers IRI3.1-0 and IRI3.2-0 were found in only 2 or 1.5% of chromosomes carrying a wild-type CCR5 allele. This evidence of linkage disequilibrium supports the hypothesis that most, if not all, CCR5 Δ32 alleles arose from a single mutational event.  Finally, the CCR5 Δ32 allele has a unique geographical distribution indicating a single Northern origin followed by migration.  A study measuring allele frequencies in 18 European populations found a North-to-South gradient, with the highest allele frequencies in Finnish and Mordvinian populations (16%), and the lowest in Sardinia (4%).

Positive selection 

In the absence of selection, a single mutation would take an estimated 127,500 years to rise to a population frequency of 10%. Estimates based on genetic recombination and mutation rates place the age of the allele between 1000 and 2000 years. This discrepancy is a signature of positive selection.

It is estimated that HIV-1 entered the human population in Africa in the early 1900s; however symptomatic infections were not reported until the 1980s. The HIV-1 epidemic is therefore far too young to be the source of positive selection that drove the frequency of CCR5 Δ32 from zero to 10% in 2000 years. Stephens, et al. (1998), suggest that bubonic plague (Yersinia pestis) had exerted positive selective pressure on CCR5 Δ32. This hypothesis was based on the timing and severity of the Black Death pandemic, which killed 30% of the European population of all ages between 1346 and 1352. After the Black Death, there were less severe, intermittent epidemics. Individual cities experienced high mortality, but overall mortality in Europe was only a few percent. In 1655-1656 a second pandemic called the "Great Plague" killed 15-20% of Europe's population. Importantly, the plague epidemics were intermittent. Bubonic plague is a zoonotic disease, primarily infecting rodents, spread by fleas, and only occasionally infecting humans. Human-to-human infection of bubonic plague does not occur, though it can occur in pneumonic plague, which infects the lungs. Only when the density of rodents is low are infected fleas forced to feed on alternative hosts such as humans, and under these circumstances a human epidemic may occur. Based on population genetic models, Galvani and Slatkin (2003) argue that the intermittent nature of plague epidemics did not generate a sufficiently strong selective force to drive the allele frequency of CCR5 Δ32 to 10% in Europe.

To test this hypothesis, Galvani and Slatkin (2003) modeled the historical selection pressures produced by plague and smallpox. Plague was modeled according to historical accounts, while age-specific smallpox mortality was gleaned from the age distribution of smallpox burials in York (England) between 1770 and 1812. Smallpox preferentially infects young, pre-reproductive members of the population since they are the only individuals who are not immunized or dead from past infection. Because smallpox preferentially kills pre-reproductive members of a population, it generates stronger selective pressure than plague. Unlike plague, smallpox does not have an animal reservoir and is only transmitted from human to human. The authors calculated that if plague were selecting for CCR5 Δ32, the frequency of the allele would still be less than 1%, while smallpox has exerted a selective force sufficient to reach 10%.

The hypothesis that smallpox exerted positive selection for CCR5 Δ32 is also biologically plausible, since poxviruses, like HIV, enter white blood cells using chemokine receptors. By contrast, Yersinia pestis is a bacterium with a very different biology.

Although Europeans are the only group to have subpopulations with a high frequency of CCR5 Δ32, they are not the only population that has been subject to selection by smallpox, which had a worldwide distribution before it was declared eradicated in 1980.  The earliest unmistakable descriptions of smallpox appear in the 5th century A.D. in China, the 7th century A.D. in India and the Mediterranean, and the 10th century A.D. in southwestern Asia. By contrast, the CCR5 Δ32 mutation is found only in European, West Asian, and North African populations. The anomalously high frequency of CCR5 Δ32 in these populations appears to require both a unique origin in Northern Europe and subsequent selection by smallpox.

Potential costs 
CCR5 Δ32 can be beneficial to the host in some infections (e.g., HIV-1, possibly smallpox), but detrimental in others (e.g., tick-borne encephalitis, West Nile virus).  Whether CCR5 function is helpful or harmful in the context of a given infection depends on a complex interplay between the immune system and the pathogen.

In general, research suggests that the CCR5 Δ32 mutation may play a deleterious role in post-infection inflammatory processes, which can injure tissue and create further pathology. The best evidence for this proposed antagonistic pleiotropy is found in flavivirus infections. In general many viral infections are asymptomatic or produce only mild symptoms in the vast majority of the population. However, certain unlucky individuals experience a particularly destructive clinical course, which is otherwise unexplained but appears to be genetically mediated. Patients homozygous for CCR5 Δ32 were found to be at higher risk for a neuroinvasive form of tick-borne encephalitis (a flavivirus). In addition, functional CCR5 may be required to prevent symptomatic disease after infection with West Nile virus, another flavivirus; CCR5 Δ32 was associated with early symptom development and more pronounced clinical manifestations after infection with West Nile virus.

This finding in humans confirmed a previously observed experiment in an animal model of CCR5 Δ32 homozygosity.  After infection with West Nile virus, CCR5 Δ32 mice had markedly increased viral titers in the central nervous system and had increased mortality compared with that of wild-type mice, thus suggesting that CCR5 expression was necessary to mount a strong host defense against West Nile virus.

Medical applications 

A genetic approach involving intrabodies that block CCR5 expression has been proposed as a treatment for HIV-1 infected individuals. When T-cells modified so they no longer express CCR5 were mixed with unmodified T-cells expressing CCR5 and then challenged by infection with HIV-1, the modified T-cells that do not express CCR5 eventually take over the culture, as HIV-1 kills the non-modified T-cells. This same method might be used in vivo to establish a virus-resistant cell pool in infected individuals.

This hypothesis was tested in an AIDS patient who had also developed myeloid leukemia, and was treated with chemotherapy to suppress the cancer.  A bone marrow transplant containing stem cells from a matched donor was then used to restore the immune system.  However, the transplant was performed from a donor with 2 copies of CCR5-Δ32 mutation gene.  After 600 days, the patient was healthy and had undetectable levels of HIV in the blood and in examined brain and rectal tissues. Before the transplant, low levels of HIV X4, which does not use the CCR5 receptor, were also detected. Following the transplant, however, this type of HIV was not detected either. However, this outcome is consistent with the observation that cells expressing the CCR5-Δ32 variant protein lack both the CCR5 and CXCR4 receptors on their surfaces, thereby conferring resistance to a broad range of HIV variants including HIVX4.  After over six years, the patient has maintained the resistance to HIV and has been pronounced cured of the HIV infection.

Enrollment of HIV-positive patients in a clinical trial was started in 2009 in which the patients' cells were genetically modified with a zinc finger nuclease to carry the CCR5-Δ32 trait and then reintroduced into the body as a potential HIV treatment.  Results reported in 2014 were promising.

Inspired by the first person ever to be cured of HIV, The Berlin Patient, StemCyte began collaborations with Cord blood banks worldwide to systematically screen Umbilical cord blood samples for the CCR5 mutation beginning in 2011.

In November 2018, Jiankui He announced that he had edited two human embryos, to attempt to disable the gene for CCR5, which codes for a receptor that HIV uses to enter cells.  He said that twin girls, Lulu and Nana, had been born a few weeks earlier, and that the girls still carried functional copies of CCR5 along with disabled CCR5 (mosaicism), hence being still vulnerable to HIV.  The work was widely condemned as unethical, dangerous, and premature.

See also 
 Discovery and development of CCR5 receptor antagonists
 Entry inhibitor
 HIV tropism
 Stephen Crohn
 HIV immunity

References

Further reading

External links 
Video and text from a PBS documentary about the discovery of CCR5
 
HIVcoPred A server for prediction of HIV coreceptor usage (CCR5). PLoS ONE 8(4): e61437
 
 

Clusters of differentiation
Genes on human chromosome 3
Chemokine receptors
T cells